Maung Saungkha, alternatively romanized as Maung Saung Kha, is a Burmese poet, human rights activist and chief commander of the Bamar People's Liberation Army.

Career 
In 2012, Maung Saungkha joined the National League for Democracy as a youth working group representative.

In 2016 he was sentenced to six months in prison for publishing "a poem about having a tattoo of a president on his penis."

On 15 January 2018 Maung Saungkha founded Athan ('voice'), an activist organisation to "promote freedom of expression and freedom of the press in Myanmar." In December 2018,  this organisation received an award from the Embassy of the Kingdom of the Netherlands for their contribution to "the promotion of freedom of expression in Myanmar." He also resigned from the National League for Democracy citing disagreement with  Aung San Suu Kyi about the government's actions on protecting the freedom of press and treatment of minorities. He became a leader of the 2021–2022 Myanmar protests.

On 17 April 2022, he co-founded the Bamar People's Liberation Army, an ethnic armed organisation that strives for ethnic federalism in Myanmar, in which he serves as a commander.

References 

Burmese human rights activists
Burmese male poets
Burmese soldiers
Living people
1992 births
21st-century Burmese poets